Dilip Kumar Paudel was the Chief Justice of Nepal from 31 July 2005 to 8 September 2007.

References 

21st-century Nepalese judges